Alfons Oehy (2 July 1926 – 19 February 1977) was a Swiss swimmer. He competed in the men's 200 metre breaststroke at the 1952 Summer Olympics.

References

External links
 

1926 births
1977 deaths
Olympic swimmers of Switzerland
Swimmers at the 1952 Summer Olympics
Place of birth missing
Swiss male breaststroke swimmers
20th-century Swiss people